Ronald M. Nate is an American far-right politician and economist serving as a member of the Idaho House of Representatives from the 34th. He is an economics professor at Brigham Young University–Idaho.

Early life and education
Nate was born in Salt Lake City, Utah. He earned Bachelor of Science in economics from the University of Utah, and a Master of Arts and a doctoral degree in economics from the University of Connecticut.

Career 
He has been a professor of economics at Brigham Young University–Idaho since 2001 and is a member of the Foundation for Economic Education faculty network.

Politics

In 2014, he ran against the incumbent Douglas A. Hancey in the Republican primary, winning with 55.3% of the vote. He ran unopposed in the general election.

In 2016, Nate won the Republican primary against Doug Ricks with 51.6% of the vote. He ran unopposed in the general election. He supported Ted Cruz in the Republican Party presidential primaries, 2016.

In 2018, Nate faced a rematch with Doug Ricks in the 2018 Idaho Republican Party primary. He lost the May primary by 159 votes with 49% of the vote. He endorsed Russ Fulcher in the Idaho 1st Congressional district race. He also endorsed Raúl Labrador for governor.

In 2018, Nate was named Idaho Republican Party state legislator of the year. Previously, he served as chairman of the Madison County Republican central committee from 2006 to 2010 and chaired the Idaho Republican caucuses in 2012. He served as an adviser to the Brigham Young University–Idaho College Republicans before the group was officially dissolved by the university in 2009.

In the 2020 elections Nate plans on running for District 34 Seat B.

From 2007 to 2013, he was a member of the Idaho Judicial Council. He was a Ted Cruz delegate at the 2016 Republican National Convention and a John McCain delegate at the 2008 Republican National Convention. He was an alternate delegate for George W. Bush at the 2004 Republican National Convention.

Additionally, he is a co-founder of the Madison Liberty Institute in Rexburg, chair of the Idaho state Republican Party's Rules Committee, state committeeman for the Madison County Republicans, a member of the Idaho Republican Resolutions Committee, and the Republican National Committee's Church of Jesus Christ of Latter-day Saints Outreach Committee.

While in office, Nate served on the Environment, Energy & Technology, Judiciary, Rules & Administration, and Revenue & Taxation committees.

In the 2020 election, Nate was reelected to the Idaho House of Representatives.

In 2022, Nate ran for re-election, but was defeated by Britt Raybould in the Republican primary.

References 

Living people
People from Rexburg, Idaho
University of Utah alumni
University of Connecticut alumni
Brigham Young University–Idaho faculty
Republican Party members of the Idaho House of Representatives
Year of birth missing (living people)
21st-century American politicians
Far-right politicians in the United States